Baghan or Baqan may refer to:
 Baghan, Bushehr, a village in Bushehr Province, Iran
 Baghan, Kavar, a village in Fars Province, Iran
 Baghan, Khonj, a village in Fars Province, Iran
 Baghan, Hajjiabad, a village in Hormozgan Province, Iran
 Baghan, Jask, a village in Jask District, Hormozgan Province, Iran
 Baghan, Kerman, a village in Kerman Province, Iran
 Baghan, Kurdistan
 Baghan, North Khorasan, a village in North Khorasan Province, Iran
 Baghan, Razavi Khorasan, a village in Razavi Khorasan Province, Iran
 Baghan, South Khorasan, a village in South Khorasan Province, Iran
 Baghan Rural District, in Fars Province

See also
 Baghin (disambiguation)